The Lompoc Hills are a low mountain range in the Transverse Ranges, near the coast and Lompoc in western Santa Barbara County, California.

Part of the range is located within the Vandenberg Air Force Base.

References 

Mountain ranges of Santa Barbara County, California
Transverse Ranges
Hills of California
Vandenberg Space Force Base
Mountain ranges of Southern California